Final Fight Championship (FFC) champions are fighters who have won FFC championships.

Current champions
The FFC is currently using six weight classes for its MMA fights and five weight classes for its kickboxing fights. Non-title fights have a one-pound leniency.

Mixed martial arts

Kickboxing

MMA championship history

Heavyweight Championship
Weight more than 205 lb (93 kg)

Light heavyweight Championship
Weight less or equal to 205 lb (93 kg)

Middleweight Championship
Weight less or equal to 185 lb (83.9 kg)

Welterweight Championship
Weight less or equal to 170 lb (77.1 kg)

Lightweight Championship
Weight less or equal to 155 lb (70.3 kg)

Featherweight Championship
Weight less or equal to 145 lb (65.7 kg)

Kickboxing championship history

Heavyweight Championship
Weight more than 205 lb (93 kg)

Light Heavyweight Championship
Weight less or equal to 205 lb (93 kg)

Middleweight Championship
Weight less or equal to 185 lb (83.9 kg)

Welterweight Championship
Weight less or equal to 170 lb (77.1 kg)

Lightweight Championship
Weight less or equal to 155 lb (70.3 kg)

See also
List of current mixed martial arts champions
Final Fight Championship

References

Lists of mixed martial artists
Lists of martial artists
Lists of kickboxers